Sir William Gore (1644 - 1707) was Lord Mayor of London from 1701-02, having been elected Alderman for the City Ward of Coleman Street in 1690.

A successful merchant, Gore was appointed a founding Director of the Bank of England in 1694 before serving as Governor of the Hamburg and Levant Companies.

Family
The son of William Gore, barrister-at-law, of Morden, Surrey and his wife Jane née Smith, Sir William was a grandson of Sir John Gore, Lord Mayor of London (died 1636), a kinsman of Arthur Gore, 1st Earl of Arran, and great-uncle of William Gore-Langton, MP. 

In 1704, Sir William bought the lordship of the manor of Tring and built Tring Park.

He died on 20 January 1707, his wife, Elizabeth née Hampton, having predeceased him (died 1705). Three of their sons were MPs: William, Thomas and John Gore.

See also  
 City of London
 Gore baronets
 Earl Temple of Stowe

References

External links
 www.Art UK.co.uk
 Burke's Peerage & Baronetage online

1644 births
1707 deaths
People associated with the Bank of England
Knights Bachelor
Sheriffs of the City of London
18th-century lord mayors of London
William